Ramapuram ("City of Rama) may refer to:

Andhra Pradesh, India 
 Ramapuram, Krishna district, a village in Krishna district, Andhra Pradesh
 Ramapuram, Kadapa, a village and a mandal in Kadapa district in the state of Andhra Pradesh
 Ramapuram, Nellore, a census village in Nellore district Andhra Pradesh

Telangana, India 
 Ramapuram, Nalgonda district, a village and a Gram panchayat of Nalgonda mandal, Nalgonda district, in Andhra Pradesh state

Tamil Nadu, India 
 Ramapuram, Chennai, a city in Chennai District closer to Guindy Railway station in Tamil Nadu
 Ramapuram, Kanyakumari, a census village in Kanyakumari District in Tamil Nadu
 Ramapuram, Thanjavur

Kerala, India 
 Ramapuram, Alappuzha, a village in Alappuzha district
 Ramapuram, Kottayam, a town in the Kottayam district
 Ramapuram, Malappuram, a town in Malappuram district

See also 
 Rampur (disambiguation), also means "City of Rama"
 Ramapura (disambiguation)